Hungary competed at the 2016 UCI Track Cycling World Championships at the Lee Valley VeloPark in London, United Kingdom from 2–4 March 2016. A team of 1 cyclists (0 women, 1 men) was announced to represent the country in the event.

Results

Men

Sources

References

Nations at the UCI Track Cycling World Championships